Marsha Haefner (born July 8, 1951) is an American politician. She was a member of the Missouri House of Representatives, serving since first being elected in 2010 to January 2019. She is a member of the Republican Party.

Public office
Haefner was elected to the Missouri House of Representatives in 2010 from the 95th District. She defeated Democratic challenger Andrew Spavale. While in the state House, she was Chair of the Fiscal Review Committee and a member of the Ethics Committee and Joint Committee on Tax Policy among others.

Potential campaign for U.S. Senate

Haefner considered a run for the U.S. Senate seat currently held by Claire McCaskill after receiving encouragement from Republican U.S. Rep. Ann Wagner (MO-02).

Electoral history

References

1951 births
21st-century American politicians
21st-century American women politicians
Living people
Republican Party members of the Missouri House of Representatives
Politicians from Kansas City, Missouri
University of Missouri alumni
Women state legislators in Missouri